Niels Vorthoren (born 21 February 1988) is a Dutch footballer who plays as a midfielder for BVV Barendrecht.

Vorthoren has played for the Netherlands and U17, U18 and U19 levels, appearing at both the 2005 UEFA European Under-17 Championship and 2005 FIFA U-17 World Championship.

Club career
Vorthoren made his debut in the Eredivisie for Willem II in the away-match against Feyenoord (0–2 loss) on 1 September 2007. In the home match against NEC Nijmegen (3–0 win) he appeared in the starting line-up for the first time. He finished the season having played 19 Eredivisie games. The following season he played less, due to an injury. Although there had been rumours Vorthoren would play for K.S.V. Roeselare (on loan) for the rest of the season, he stayed with Willem II. He moved to FC Den Bosch at the start of the 2009–10 Eredivisie season.
The season 2017 he will play for Norwegian Start in OBOS-ligaen.

Vorthoren left Sandnes Ulf at the end of 2018. On 12 April 2019, it was announced that Vorthoren would join BVV Barendrecht from the 2019–20 season. He signed a one-year contract extension with the club in January 2020.

International career
Vorthoren gained 13 caps for the Netherlands under-17 team, in which he scored two goals. He was part of the team competing at the 2005 UEFA European Under-17 Championship and 2005 FIFA U-17 World Championship. He also made four appearances for the under-19 team.

References

External links

1988 births
Living people
Dutch footballers
Willem II (football club) players
FC Den Bosch players
Excelsior Rotterdam players
VV Capelle players
MVV Maastricht players
BK Häcken players
Eredivisie players
Eerste Divisie players
Derde Divisie players
Allsvenskan players
People from Werkendam
Kozakken Boys players
IK Start players
Sandnes Ulf players
BVV Barendrecht players
Norwegian First Division players
Dutch expatriate footballers
Expatriate footballers in Sweden
Dutch expatriate sportspeople in Sweden
Expatriate footballers in Norway
Dutch expatriate sportspeople in Norway
Association football midfielders
Netherlands youth international footballers
Footballers from North Brabant